The Borough of Havant is a local government district with borough status and as Havant and Waterloo an unparished area in Hampshire, England. Its council is based in Havant. Other places within the borough include Bedhampton, Cowplain, Emsworth, Hayling Island, Purbrook, Waterlooville and Widley. The borough covers much of the semi-urban area in the south east of Hampshire, between the city of Portsmouth and the West Sussex border.

History 
The Havant and Waterloo urban district was reconstituted as a non-metropolitan district named just "Havant" by the Local Government Act 1972 on 1 April 1974.

Havant Borough Council

Elections to the borough council are held in three out of every four years, with one third of the 38 seats on the council being elected at each election. The Conservative party held a majority on the council  from 1978 until they lost a majority in 1990. No party had a majority until the 2002 election when the Conservatives regained overall control. Since then the Conservatives have had a majority and as of the 2011 election the council is composed of the following councillors:

Wards
The wards are:
Barncroft
Battins
Bedhampton
Bondfields
Cowplain
Emsworth
Hart Plain
Hayling East
Hayling West
Purbrook
St Faith's
Stakes
Warren Park
Waterlooville

See also
List of places of worship in the Borough of Havant

References

External links
 Havant Borough Council
 Havant Borough Tree Wardens

 
Non-metropolitan districts of Hampshire
Boroughs in England